Dębina  is a village in the administrative district of Gmina Ustka, within Słupsk County, Pomeranian Voivodeship, in northern Poland. It is located on the Slovincian Coast.

The village has a population of 112.

References

Villages in Słupsk County